Spring break is a vacation period including Easter holidays in early spring at universities and schools, which started during the 1930s in the US (but already existed in Europe since the late 1800s) and is now observed in many other countries as well. Spring break is frequently associated with extensive gatherings and riotous partying in warm climate locations, attended regardless of participants' educational standings.

As a holiday it is variously known as Easter vacation, Easter holiday, Easter break, spring break, spring vacation, mid-term break, study week, reading week, reading period, Easter week or March break, depending on regional conventions.

History
In the mid-1930s, a swimming coach from Colgate University decided to take his team down to Florida for some early training at a brand-new Olympic-size pool in sunny Fort Lauderdale. The idea clicked with other college swim coaches and soon the spring training migration became an annual tradition for swimmers nationwide. Now, spring break is an academic tradition in various mostly western countries that is scheduled for different periods depending on the state and sometimes the region.

Asia

Japan
In Japan, the spring break starts with the end of the academic year in late March and ends around April 7 with the beginning of a new academic year.

Hong Kong 
Hong Kong follows the British tradition of Easter break, usually about one and a half-week.

Iran 
In Iran, spring break starts at Nowruz and ends on Sizdah Bedar, All Iranians have the same spring break.

Kuwait
In Kuwait, the spring break is between the two academic or school semesters, usually in December or January, but could last until early February. It is usually a two- or three-week break, however, there is no fixed date for it, as the date is adjusted in accordance with the Lunar or Hijri calendar, as it is the case for almost all Arab and Muslim nations.

Macau 
Macau follows the Portuguese tradition of Easter break.

South Korea
In South Korea, the spring break lasts for about a week in early May, around Children's Day.

Before 2015, the spring break lasted for two weeks in February with the new school year beginning afterwards.

Taiwan 
In Taiwan, spring break usually refers to the consecutive days off of Tomb Sweeping Day and Children's Day.

UAE (United Arab Emirates) 
In UAE, spring break is usually two or three weeks long from late March to early/middle of April. It usually depends on the school or the emirate.

Europe

Czech Republic
In the Czech Republic, only primary and secondary school students have a spring break. The break is one week long and the date of the break differs from county to county to avoid overcrowding of the break destinations in the Czech Republic (Czechs usually travel to the mountains to ski there). The counties are divided into six groups, each group containing counties evenly distributed across the country. The first group starts the holiday on the first Monday of February, the last group starts the holiday five weeks later (usually in early March). The last group of counties becomes the first one to have the spring break the next year.

Georgia
Before 2017, the spring break in Georgia was typically an Easter holiday, lasting from Thursday to Tuesday in the Holy Week. In 2017, the new Minister of Education and Science of Georgia Aleksandre Jejelava made a new reform by which, students of preschools, elementary & high schools as well as colleges and universities get six days of holiday in March, lasting from March 8 to 15, for people to go on winter vacations or do other activities.

Germany
In Germany, universities typically schedule a semester break of five to eight weeks around March. The Whitsun (Pentecost) holidays around late May or early June are also considered a spring break.

Greece
In Greece, spring break takes place during the Holy Week and the one after it.

Lithuania
In Lithuania, spring break (called Easter holidays or spring holidays) takes place one week before Easter and one day after it (as it is the second day of Easter), all school students have this vacation. Primary school students have another week of holidays after Easter.

Portugal
In Portugal, spring break is mostly known as "Easter Holidays" and it gives two weeks to all students around the country.

Russia
Before 1917 there was an Easter Break in schools. In the Soviet Union, spring break was always from March 24 to 31. Now, many schools in Russia still have the spring break, but the exact date is decided by the school itself. In the majority of cases it is set in the middle of April. Also, the public holidays in May, connected with Labour day and Victory day, can be an accurate equivalent of the spring break.

Slovakia 
Slovakia gives a week-long break to its elementary school and secondary school students in the months of February and March. Instead of vacationing in warm weather destinations, the Slovaks mostly associate spring breaks with skiing. The break is one week long and the date of the break differs from region to region to avoid overcrowding of the break destinations in the Slovak Republic. The regions are divided into three groups, the first group starts the holiday on the end of February, the last group starts the holiday two weeks later (in early March).

There is, as well, another shorter Easter break which starts on Holy Thursday and ends on next Tuesday.

Spain
In Spain, there is no spring break. Instead, the Holy Week is celebrated and students usually have holidays during these days.

United Kingdom
The Easter break in the United Kingdom is from two to three weeks (depending on the local council and school policy) for primary and secondary schools, and for two to four weeks for university students, and fits around Easter. The understood US style Spring Break is not what is practiced in the UK, however. It is called the Easter break/Easter half term holiday. Spring Break is a term used to refer to what Americans do, when 21 (or sooner) and lots of drinking and partying.

North America

Canada
Canadian provinces give a one or two-week-long break to its elementary school and secondary school students in the month of March, with the time varying from province to province; New Brunswick and Quebec, for example, place their March breaks during the first week of March; Ontario, Nova Scotia, and British Columbia schedule theirs during the second or third week; the break in Alberta and Manitoba usually occurs in the last week of March. In Canada, spring Break for post-secondary students is called 'reading week' or 'reading break,' depending on the duration. However, the formal title of Mid-term Break has been the preferred generic term. Reading Week in Canada usually occurs in the month of February, usually coinciding with Family Day.

In primary and secondary school, this break is called 'March break' and in university/college it is usually 'reading week.' Neither example is commonly associated with the party culture of American spring break, though many American students visit Canada during their spring break, which occurs later, to take advantage of looser Canadian laws surrounding alcohol and cannabis.

Jamaica
In Jamaica, the spring break starts in the first week of Good Friday. The break may range from one week to two weeks, often two. This break starts depending on which month the Easter holiday begins, March or April.

Mexico
In Mexico, spring break takes place during the Holy Week and the one after it.

United States

In the United States, spring break at universities, colleges, and many K-12 school systems can occur from March to April, depending on term dates and when Easter holiday falls. Usually, spring break is about one or two weeks long, although some schools may just schedule it for the last week of March, with separate days off for the Easter holiday.

Guatemala, El Salvador and Honduras
In Guatemala, El Salvador and Honduras, it takes place during Easter; schools give students a whole week to rest while the staff workforce rests approximately three days.

South America

Colombia
In Colombia, autumn break takes place the first week of April, during the Holy Week until the second week, corresponding to the time of Spring Break in the Northern Hemisphere.

Chile
In Chile, many schools and universities take vacations in the middle of September coinciding with the celebration of the Fiestas Patrias (Celebration of that country). Being located in the Southern Hemisphere, spring begins approximately at the end of this holiday week so it acts similarly to the United States spring break.

Spring break festivals

Large annual spring break festivities take place in various countries, often in the form of music festivals and joined by special nightclub parties, beach activities and accommodation offers.

Pacific
The South Pacific enjoys spring break during November. Some tour companies are now chartering out entire island resorts for the festivities.

Fiji
 Fiji

Cook Islands
 Rarotonga

Europe
European party destinations are increasingly becoming popular for international spring break guests. Tour agencies have cited the lower drinking ages in these places and that even then, they are rarely enforced. Some tour companies put on special chartered flights for spring break at discounted rates.

Croatia

 Novalja (Zrće Beach)

Germany
 Pouch
 Rugia (Binz/Prora) and Usedom islands (Kaiser Spa)

Greece
 Mykonos

Hungary
 Siófok (Lake Balaton)

Italy
 Rimini

Spain
 Ibiza
 Lloret de Mar
 Magaluf (Mallorca)
 Salou

North America

Caribbean
 Montego Bay, Jamaica
 Nassau, Bahamas
 Punta Cana, Dominican Republic

Mexico
 Acapulco
 Cancún
 Cabo San Lucas

United States
In the US, many people take the holiday off. The holiday is celebrated near Easter, and many families will hold easter egg hunts or will celebrate with Easter activities.

Panama City Beach, Florida
Starting in the late '90s, Panama City Beach began advertising the destination hoping to attract crowds that had formerly gone to Fort Lauderdale and then Daytona Beach before those communities enacted restrictions.  From 2010 to 2016 an estimated 300,000 students traveled to the destination. The spawn of social media and digital marketing helped boost the beach town into a student mecca during March. Following well publicized shootings and a gang rape in 2015, several new ordinances were put into effect prohibiting drinking on the beach and establishing a bar closing time of 2 am. Central Time. Reports show a drop in Panama City Beach's spring break turnout in March 2016 followed by increased family tourism in April 2016.  Both are attributed to the new ordinances by the Bay County Community Development Corporation (CDC).

Fort Lauderdale, Florida
Fort Lauderdale's reputation as a spring break destination for college students started when the Colgate University men's swim team arrived to practice there over Christmas break in 1934. Attracting approximately 20,000 college students in the 1950s, spring break was still known as 'Spring vacation' and was a relatively low key affair. This began to change when Glendon Swarthout’s novel, Where the Boys Are was published in 1960, effectively ushering in modern spring break. Swarthout's 1960 novel was quickly made into a movie of the same title later that year, Where the Boys Are, in which college girls met boys while on spring break there. The number of visiting college students immediately jumped to over 50,000. By the early 1980s, Ft. Lauderdale was attracting between 250,000 and 350,000 college students per year during spring break. Residents of the Fort Lauderdale area became so upset at the damage done by college students that the local government passed laws restricting parties in 1985. At the same time, the National Minimum Drinking Age Act was enacted in the United States, requiring that Florida raise the minimum drinking age from 18 to 21 and inspiring many underage college vacationers to travel to other competing locations in the United States for spring break. By 1989, the number of college students traveling to Fort Lauderdale fell to 20,000, a far cry from the 350,000 who went four years prior.

South Padre Island, Texas
In the early 1980s, South Padre Island became the first location outside of Florida to draw a large number of college students for spring break. With only a few thousand residents, South Padre Island has consistently drawn between 80,000 and 120,000 spring breakers for the last 30 years.

Corporate marketing
It is common for major brands that cater to the youth market (e.g., Coca-Cola, Gillette, MTV, and branches of the United States Armed Forces) to market at spring break destinations.

See also
 Girls Gone Wild (franchise)
 Schoolies week
 Senior Week
 Wet T-shirt contest

References

External links
 

Types of secular holidays
Spring (season)
Student culture
Types of tourism